The Avro Type F was an early single seat British aircraft from Avro.  On 1 May 1912 it became the first aircraft in the world to fly with a completely enclosed cabin for the pilot as an integral part of the design.

Design and development
It was a wire-braced mid-wing monoplane  with a tailskid undercarriage. The fuselage  was teardrop-shaped with flat sides and cellon windows. Oil leakage from the engine had been anticipated to obscure pilot view by coating cabin windows; so two circular windows at the pilot's head level could be opened for the pilot's head to protrude when flying, but their use proved unnecessary. Ingress and egress was via a sheet-aluminum trapdoor in the fuselage top. The cabin was quite cramped, being only 2 ft (60 cm) across at its widest point.

The Type F made a few test flights in mid-1912 until damaged beyond repair in a hard landing on 13 September, after which it was not repaired. Its Viale 35 hp engine is on display at the Science Museum in London; and the rudder was preserved by the Royal Aero Club.

Specifications

References

 
 
 Avro Type F – British Aircraft Directory

1910s British experimental aircraft
Type F
Single-engined tractor aircraft
Mid-wing aircraft
Aircraft first flown in 1912